For the 2008 Summer Olympics in Beijing, a total of thirty-seven venues were used. Events took place at eleven pre-existing venues, twelve new venues constructed for the Olympics, and eight temporary venues that were removed following the games. In addition, six venues outside Beijing hosted events, two of which were newly built for the Olympics.

Beijing won its bid to host the 2008 Olympics on 13 July 2001. The first new venues to begin construction were the Beijing National Stadium, Beijing National Aquatics Center, Beijing Shooting Range Hall, and the Laoshan Velodrome, where major work commenced in December 2003. By May 2007, construction had begun at all of the Beijing venues for the games. Approximately RMB¥13 billion (US$1.9 billion) was spent to build and renovate the venues.

Several venues were located at the Olympic Green Olympic Park. The largest venue at the games in terms of seating capacity was the Beijing National Stadium, also known as the Bird's Nest, which had a capacity of 91,000 at the time and was the site for the opening and closing ceremonies. The smallest venue in terms of seating capacity was the temporary Laoshan Mountain Bike Course, which had a capacity of 2,000.

Venues

Olympic Green

Universities and gymnasiums

New competition venues

Existing competition venues

Temporary competition venues

Competition venues outside Beijing

Notes 
1. Both the Urban Road Cycling Course and the Qingdao International Sailing Center did not have spectator seating, and therefore no capacities are listed in this table. Spectators for events held at these venues could observe events held in them from regular pedestrian areas such as sidewalks.

References

External links 
Olympic Venue Distribution overlay on Google Maps – Unofficial overlay on satellite imagery. (Overlay on MSN Maps)

 
2008
Buildings and structures in Beijing
Beijing-related lists
Sport in Beijing
Olympics